The 1999 Primera B de Chile was the 49th completed season of the Primera B de Chile.

Unión Española was tournament’s champion.

First phase

League tables

Second phase
Half of the first phase points were carried over as bonus points in the second phase.

League table

Promotion/relegation play-offs

References

External links
 RSSSF 1999

Primera B de Chile seasons
Primera B
Chil